There have been two baronetcies created for members of the Monson family, one in the Baronetage of England and one in the Baronetage of the United Kingdom.

The Monson baronetcy, of Carleton in the County of Lincoln, was created on 29 June 1611 for Thomas Monson. The fifth Baronet was created Baron Monson in 1728. For more information on this creation, see this title.

The Monson baronetcy, of Thatched House Lodge in the County of Surrey, was created in the Baronetage of the United Kingdom on 23 February 1905 for the Hon. Edmund Monson, who had held a number of diplomatic posts, ultimately British Ambassador to France from 1896 to 1904. He was the fourth son of the sixth Baron Monson. The second baronet had no sons and was succeeded by his two brothers. The 3rd baronet was also a British diplomat.  The title became extinct on the death of the fourth Baronet in 1969.

Monson baronets, of Carleton (1611)
see Baron Monson

Monson baronets, of Thatched House Lodge (1905)
Sir Edmund John Monson, 1st Baronet (1834–1909)
Sir Maxwell William Edmund John Monson, 2nd Baronet (1882–1936)
Sir Edmund St. John Debonnaire John Monson, 3rd Baronet (1883–1969)
Sir George Louis Esmé John Monson, 4th Baronet (1888–1969)

References

 

Baronetcies in the Baronetage of England
Extinct baronetcies in the Baronetage of the United Kingdom
1611 establishments in England
1905 establishments in the United Kingdom